The Ociu is a right tributary of the river Crișul Alb in Romania. It discharges into the Crișul Alb in Ocișor.

References

Rivers of Romania
Rivers of Arad County
Rivers of Hunedoara County